Baban (also Romanized as Bābān; also known as Buvan) is a village in Hajjilu Rural District, in the Central District of Kabudarahang County, Sababdaj Province, Iran. At the 2006 census, its population was 3,026, in 608 families.

References 

Populated places in Kabudarahang County